The 1800 United States presidential election in South Carolina took place between October 31 and December 3, 1800, as part of the 1800 United States presidential election. The state legislature chose 8 representatives, or electors to the Electoral College, who voted for President and Vice President.

During this election, South Carolina cast 8 electoral votes for incumbent Democratic-Republican Party candidate Vice President Thomas Jefferson.

References

South Carolina
1800
1800 South Carolina elections